Éric Casimir (born 20 February 1977) is a French gymnast. He competed at the 2000 Summer Olympics.

References

External links
 

1977 births
Living people
French male artistic gymnasts
Olympic gymnasts of France
Gymnasts at the 2000 Summer Olympics
People from Le Port, Réunion